The women's shot put event at the 1999 European Athletics U23 Championships was held in Göteborg, Sweden, at Ullevi on 30 July 1999.

Medalists

Results

Final
30 July

Participation
According to an unofficial count, 11 athletes from 6 countries participated in the event.

 (1)
 (3)
 (1)
 (1)
 (3)
 (2)

References

Shot put
Shot put at the European Athletics U23 Championships